The 1966 South Pacific Games, held at Nouméa in New Caledonia from 8–18 December 1966, was the second edition of the South Pacific Games.

Participating countries
Fourteen Pacific nations or territories participated in the Games:

Sports
Twelve sports were contested at the 1966 South Pacific Games:

Note: A number in parentheses indicates how many medal events were contested in that sport (where known).

Final medal table
In a significant turnaround of fortunes backed by French government investment, New Caledonia took the mantle at the top of the medal table from Fiji and French Polynesia obtained third position.

See also
Athletics at the 1966 South Pacific Games
Football at the 1966 South Pacific Games
Rugby union at the 1966 South Pacific Games

Notes
 Men's and women's basketball (five-a-side) competitions were held. A women's netball competition (seven-a-side) was also held.

 A 100 km individual road race and 70 km team road race were held, as well as events for 1 km time trial, 4 km individual pursuit, 1 km sprint, and 4 km Olympic pursuit.

 The sports of tennis and table tennis had three competitions each. These were all team events (i.e. competitions for men's, women's and mixed teams).

References

Sources

Pacific Games by year
International sports competitions hosted by New Caledonia
Pacific Games
Pacific Games
 
1966 in New Caledonia
December 1966 sports events in Oceania